TUDN (formerly Univision Deportes) is a sports programming division of Univision, a Spanish language broadcast television network owned by TelevisaUnivision USA, that is responsible for the production of televised coverage of sports events and magazine programs that air on the parent Univision network and sister network UniMás, and cable channels Galavisión and TUDN TV channel. The division's premier sports properties are its broadcast rights to Liga MX, select matches involving the Mexico and United States men's national soccer teams, tournament matches from the CONCACAF Gold Cup and Copa América. The division's headquarters are at TelevisaUnivision USA's South Florida headquarters in the Miami suburb of Doral, Florida.

History

On May 7, 2019, Univision has announced that they'll form a partnership with Grupo Televisa and rename Univision Deportes to TUDN. The new branding is a combination of abbreviations TDN and UDN, but the first two letters are also pronounced as the Spanish adjective "tu" (your), allowing the name to also be read as "Tu deportes network" ("Your sports network"). TUDN will be promoted as a multi-platform brand, and there will be closer collaboration between the American and Mexican counterparts—allowing for expanded studio programming in the morning and daytime hours (to bolster its expansion into European soccer with its recent acquisition of UEFA rights, and existing content such as Liga MX soccer). The rebranding took place on July 20 with a new slate of content built around live programming. UDN and Univision Deportes Radio were also renamed in line with this rebranding.

Programs throughout the years

Current broadcast rights
Soccer
 Liga MX (encompassing Univision, UniMás, Galavisión and TUDN)
 América
 Atlas
 Atlético San Luis
 Cruz Azul
 Juárez
 León
 Mazatlán
 Necaxa
 Pachuca
 Puebla
 Toluca
 Querétaro
 UANL
 UNAM
 Liga MX Femenil
 América
 Cruz Azul
 Juárez
 Toluca
 UANL
 UNAM
 Mexico national football team
 CONCACAF (2012–present)
 CONCACAF Gold Cup (2000–present)
 CONCACAF Champions League
 CONCACAF Nations League
 CONCACAF Futsal Championship
 CONCACAF U-20 Championship
 CONCACAF U-17 Championship
 CONCACAF Women's U-20 Championship
 CONCACAF Women's U-17 Championship
 CONMEBOL
Copa América (2016, 2021)
Copa América Femenina (2022)
CONMEBOL Pre-Olympic Tournament
 Lamar Hunt U.S. Open Cup (2012–present; TUDN)
 UEFA (2018–2024)
UEFA Euro 2020 (inc. qualifiers)
 UEFA Nations League
 2022 FIFA World Cup qualification
 UEFA Youth and Junior Championships (U-21, U-19, and U-17)
 UEFA Men's (A-team and U-19) and Women's Futsal Championships
UEFA Champions League (2018–2024)
 UEFA Europa League (2018–2024)
 UEFA Europa Conference League (2021–2024)
 UEFA Super Cup (2018–2023)
 UEFA Youth League (2018–2024)

Other programming
 Contacto Deportivo – weeknight sports news program (Univision, 2015–present; UniMás, 2002–2015)
 Fútbol Central – weekly football analysis/pre-game show (TUDN, 2012–present; Univision, 2015–present)

 Fútbol Club – football analysis program on TUDN (2012–present)
Línea de 4 – In-depth analysis and opinion program of the most important sporting events of the day.
Misión Europa – The best information about European football including Champions League and Europa League.
Republica Deportiva – Sunday sports news/talk program (daytime edition, 1999–present; late-night edition, 2015–present)
Sábado Futbolero – Full coverage of the Liga MX matches on Saturday.

Former programs
Auto racing
 Formula One (2013–2017; TUDN, UniMas)

Soccer
 FIFA Confederations Cup (1997, 2001, 2005, 2009 and 2013)
 FIFA World Cup (1970, 1974, 1978, 1982, 1986, 1990, 1994, 1998, 2002, 2006, 2010, 2014)
 FIFA Women's World Cup (1999, 2003, 2007, 2011)
 Ligue 1
 Bundesliga (2017–2020)
 A-League
 Major League Soccer (2007–2022)
 MLS Cup (2007–2022)
 MLS All-Star Game (2007–2022)
 U.S. men's national soccer team
 U.S. women's national soccer team

Notable personalities

Present

Play-by-play  
 Alfredo Tame 
 Andrés Vaca
 Antonio Gómez Luna
 Chris Wittyngham (English SAP only)
 Daniel Nohra
 Emilio Fernando Alonso
 Enrique Bermúdez
 Felipe Sebastián Muñoz
 Francisco "Paco" Villa
 Jorge Sánchez
 José Cerna (English SAP only)
 José Hernández (both Spanish and English SAP)
 José Luis López Salido
 Luis Alberto Martínez (both Spanish and English SAP)
 Luis Omar Tapia
 Marco Cancino
 Ramon Aranza

 Ramsés Sandoval (both Spanish and English SAP) 
 Raúl Méndez 
 Raúl Pérez
 Xavier Sol

Anchors

 Lindsay Casinelli
 Alejandro Berry
Ana Caty Hernández (Based at Televisa Deportes in Mexico City)
 Tania Rincón
 Ramsés Sandoval
 Felipe Sebastián Muñoz

Analysts
 Alejandro Berry (both Spanish and English SAP)
 Carlos Pavon
 Damián Zamogilny
 Diego Balado
 Emanuel Villa
 Enrique Borja
 Félix Fernández 
 Francisco Fonseca 
 Georgina Gonzalez
 Hugo Salcedo
 Hristo Stoichkov
 Iván Zamorano
 Manuel Barrera
 Marc Crosas 
 Marco Antonio Rodriguez
 Marcelo Balboa
 María Fernanda Mora
 Mauricio Cienfuegos
 Moisés Muñoz
 Paulo Wanchope
 Ramon Ramirez
 Reinaldo Navia

Field Reporters
 Alonso Cabral
 Antonio Gomez Luna
 Cristina Romero (Europe-based reporter)
 Daniel Chanona (Europe-based reporter)
 Daniel Schvartzman (US-based reporter)
 Daniel Velasco
 Diana Ballinas
 Diego Armando Medina
 Diego Peña
 Fernando Jesús Torres	
 Francisco Arredondo
 Gibrán Araige
 Guadalupe Flores Peña
 Hugo Ramirez
 Karina Herrera
 Israel Romo 
 Javier Rojas
 Juan Carlos Zamora
 Mario Alberto Valdez
 Michele Giannone (US-based reporter)
 Nathalie Juarez
 Xavier Sol
 Vladimir Garcia
 Yussif Caro

Former

Play-by-play
 Andrés Cantor
 Nicolás Cantor
 Jorge Pérez Navarro
Rodolfo Landeros
Juan Carlos 'Chiquis' Cruz
Pablo Ramírez

Analysts
 Norberto Longo
 Jesús Bracamontes

Reporters

Studio hosts
 Fernando Fiore
Iván Kasanzew (nicknamed "El Conde K")
Lucía Villalón
 Rosana Franco
 Tony Cherchi
 Adriana Monsalve

Presidents
 Alexander "Sandy" Brown (2011–2012)
 Juan Carlos Rodríguez (2012–present)

Related properties

Television channel

TUDN (formerly known as Univision Deportes Network) is a digital cable and satellite channel that was launched by Univision Communications on April 7, 2012; the network mainly broadcasts soccer events (from leagues such as Liga MX (through individual teams rights held by the division), the CONCACAF Champions League and Major League Soccer); related news, analysis and documentary programming (such as its flagship sports news program Univision Deportes Fútbol Club and Univision Deportes Extra); and shows originated by the Mexican counterpart channel through Univision's longstanding programming agreement with Televisa.

During its times as UDN, it previously operated a secondary channel, Univision Deportes Network 2, which carried additional sports content including rebroadcasts of sports events originally seen on its parent network and studio programming; Univision Deportes Network 2, which was exclusive to Dish Network and created through a carriage agreement with the satellite provider struck in January 2012, ceased operations in 2014.

TUDN Radio

TUDN Radio (formerly Univision Deportes Radio) is a Spanish language sports radio network with a main focus on soccer. It was launched on April 19, 2017 on 10 Univision owned-and-operated stations previously affiliated with Univision America.

See also
 Sports broadcasting contracts in the United States

Notes and references

External links
 

Univision
Sports television in the United States
1962 establishments in California
Companies based in Miami
Soccer on United States television
Sports television networks